Africa West was a cargo airline based in Lomé, Togo. The company was founded in 1997 and mainly operated in West Africa and Central Africa.

History 
Africa West was an integrated transportation company, operated exclusively for freight forwarders, specialized on the transportation of outsize shipments. The cargo airline used a fleet of 1 Boeing 757 (leased to Icelandair), 1 DC-9 and covered over 21 destinations.

Network 

Regional Hub

 Lomé (LFW)
 Brazzaville (BZV)
 Douala (DLA)
 Monrovia (MLW)
 Malabo (SSG)
 Cotonou (COO)
 Bangui (BGF)
 Ouagadougou (OUA)
 Pointe Noire (PNR)
 Bamako (BKO)
 Freetown (FNA)
 Niamey (NIM)
 Conakry (CKY)
 Libreville (LBV)

References

External links
Africa West Fleet Detail

Defunct airlines of Togo
Airlines established in 1997
Lomé